Klučov is a municipality and village in Kolín District in the Central Bohemian Region of the Czech Republic. It has about 1,100 inhabitants.

Administrative parts
Villages of Lstiboř, Skramníky and Žhery are administrative parts of Klučov.

References

Villages in Kolín District